Jerrell C. Jones (born March 28, 1986), better known by his stage name J-Kwon, is an American rapper best known for his 2004 single "Tipsy," which peaked at number two in 2004.

Life and career
At age 12, Jones was expelled from his home for allegedly dealing illegal drugs. He slept at his friends' homes and in cars. After winning one rap battle, he suffered a broken jaw from childhood friend Marquise.

J-Kwon first rose to stardom with the single "Tipsy" from his 2004 album Hood Hop, which peaked at number two on the Billboard 200 on April 17, 2004, after 14 weeks on the chart. The song peaked at number two on the Billboard Hot 100. It performed well internationally, peaking within the top ten of the charts in Australia and the United Kingdom. Other singles included "You & Me" with Sadiyyah and "Hood Hop."   

For the 2005 film XXX: State of the Union, J-Kwon performed the single "Get XXX'd" with Petey Pablo and Ebony Eyez. J-Kwon began working on the follow-up to Hood Hop, Louisville Slugger, that same year. He collaborated with comedian Andy Milonakis in "Like Dis", to promote The Andy Milonakis Show, and appeared on Bow Wow's single "Fresh Azimiz". In 2008, he released a single "Boo Boo" through his own label Hood Hop Music with album Hood Hop 2 following the next year exclusively for digital download. Follow-up Hood Hop 2.5 was released on CD on July 28, 2009. Its first official single was "Louie Bounce (I Smacked Nikki)".

In March 2010, J-Kwon's record label, Gracie Entertainment, said that he had been missing since early February 2010. Later the same month, MTV News reported that he had been in touch with the record label, confirming he was alive and well.

J-Kwon released his fourth studio album on March 23, 2010, entitled J-Kwon.

In June 2013, he made a diss track titled "Pushing the Odds" produced by H Snow Beatz towards Odd Future and Pusha T after previous disses from both.

Discography

 Hood Hop (2004)
 Hood Hop 2 (2009)
 Hood Hop 2.5 (2009)
 J-Kwon (2010)

References

1986 births
Living people
21st-century American male musicians
21st-century American rappers
African-American male rappers
American male rappers
Arista Records artists
Midwest hip hop musicians
Rappers from St. Louis
So So Def Recordings artists